Parliamentary elections were held in the Federated States of Micronesia on 7 March 1989 alongside a referendum on electing a Constitutional Convention. All candidates for seats in Congress ran as independents. The referendum was held in compliance with article 2, section 9 of the constitution, which specified that there must be a referendum on convening a Constitutional Convention at least every ten years. It was approved by 71% of voters, and the Constitutional Convention election was subsequently held in 1990.

Results

Referendum

References

Micronesia
1989 in the Federated States of Micronesia
Elections in the Federated States of Micronesia
Non-partisan elections
Micronesia
Referendums in the Federated States of Micronesia